Grevillea microstyla is a species of flowering plant in the family Proteaceae and is endemic to the Kimberley region of Western Australia. It is a small shrub with divided or toothed leaves with dense clusters of crimson flowers that have a dull orange style.

Description

TaxonomyGrevillea microstyla was first formally described in 2000 by Matthew Barrett and Robert Makinson in the Flora of Australia from specimens collected in 1998. The specific epithet (microstyla) means "having a small style".

Distribution and habitat
This grevillea grows in grassy woodland in shallow valleys and below ridges in the western Kimberley region of northern Western Australia.

Conservation statusGrevillea microstyla'' is listed as"Priority Two" by the Western Australian Government Department of Biodiversity, Conservation and Attractions, meaning that it is poorly known and from only one or a few locations.

See also
 List of Grevillea species

References

microstyla
Proteales of Australia
Eudicots of Western Australia
Taxa named by Matthew David Barrett
Taxa named by Robert Owen Makinson
Plants described in 2000